is a Japanese manga series written and illustrated by Katsuwo. The manga was serialized in ASCII Media Works' Monthly Comic Dengeki Daioh magazine from 2014 to June 27, 2020. An anime television series adaptation directed by Tomoyuki Kawamura and produced by Silver Link aired between January and March 2018.

Premise
Set in Ueno, the series follows three elementary school girls named Yui, Sat-chan and Kotoha, who form an organization known as "The Colors". Together, they perform various deeds and errands to protect the peace in their town.

Characters

The very shy designated leader of the Colors. Her catchphrase is "Trigonometric functions!".

An energetic girl who comes up with crazy ideas. Her catchphrase is "Extra virgin oil!".

A relaxed girl who constantly plays video games, despite not being very good at them. Yui often exploits this fact to tease Kotoha. She has sadistic tendencies. Her catchphrase is "I've beat this game!".

A policeman who watches over the city and constantly comes at odds with the Colors.

 / 

An old man who runs a general store called Whale Factory and is nicknamed "Pops" by the Colors. He comes up with various devices for the Colors to play with and is always seen wearing a different pair of novelty sunglasses.

Sat-chan's mother who runs a fruit store called Kise Fruits.

A high schoolgirl who is nicknamed "Nono". She works at her family bakery called Sasaki Bread.

Nonoka's older sister who is nicknamed "Moka". She knows how to make delicious varieties of onigiri.

Nonoka's classmate who has a lot of part-time jobs. Nonoka often jokingly tells the Colors that her friend might repeat a year in high school because of that.

Media

Manga
The original manga series written by Katsuwo began serialization in ASCII Media Works' Monthly Comic Dengeki Daioh magazine in 2014. Seven tankōbon volumes have been released as of October 26, 2019. The series finished after 72 chapters, ending in the August 2020 issue of Dengeki Daioh which released in June 2020.

Anime
An anime adaptation was announced at the Dengeki Comic Festival 2017 on March 12, 2017, which was later confirmed to be a television series on July 27, 2017. The anime series is being directed by Tomoyuki Kawamura and produced by Silver Link, with series composition by Shogo Yasukawa and character design by Takumi Yokota. The 12-episode series aired in Japan between January 7 and March 25, 2018. Sentai Filmworks licensed the series in North America and streamed it on Hidive.

Reception
The show received mixed reviews. Paul Jensen of Anime News Network said that the show doesn't "quite translate into anything truly memorable", and said the show's early episodes focus too much on the "key personality traits" in its early episodes, but said it is "still perfectly watchable" in those episodes. However, he said that by the show's fourth episode, the show has a "comfortable rhythm" that balances humor and jokes, saying it reminded him of Non Non Biyori. He concluded that the show is "entertaining to watch" and relaxing, but it not "genuinely memorable" and criticized the animation and art for being "above average". However, in reviewing the first episode, Rebecca Silverman of the same website described it as a "cute girls show" she can "get behind", Theron Martin called it "charming", and Nick Creamer called it a "a joy from start to finish" while Lynzee Loveridge was more critical.

See also
Hitori Bocchi no Marumaru Seikatsu – Another manga series by the same author

Notes

References

External links
Official website 
 

2014 manga
Anime series based on manga
Comedy anime and manga
Dengeki Comics
Kadokawa Dwango franchises
Manga series
Sentai Filmworks
Shōnen manga
Silver Link
Slice of life anime and manga